Dipak Bhattacharjee was an Indian politician. He was elected as MLA of Hailakandi Vidhan Sabha Constituency in Assam Legislative Assembly in 1978. He died on 29 January 2019 at the age of 79.

References

2019 deaths
Assam MLAs 1978–1983
Communist Party of India (Marxist) politicians
Bengali politicians
Year of birth missing